Star North American Championship are annual North American Championship sailing regattas in the Star class organised by the International Star Class Yacht Racing Association.

Editions

Medalists

References

Star (keelboat) competitions
North America and Caribbean championships in sailing
Recurring sporting events established in 1939
1939 establishments in North America